Lists of libertarian topics include:

 List of libertarian organizations
 List of libertarian political parties
 List of libertarians in the United States

Libertarianism